Dennis Hammer is a television producer whose credits include Empire, Colony, Heroes, Crossing Jordan, and Dynasty. Before moving to television, Hammer was a theater publicist working for Gordon Davidson at the Mark Taper Forum and Ahmanson Theater in Los Angeles.

Career 
The veteran producer began his career in television as a casting director at Aaron Spelling Productions and eventually became a producer for popular Spelling series such as The Love Boat and Dynasty. He also developed and produced all twenty of the Danielle Steel Television movies for NBC; these became one of the most successful made-for-television franchises in television history. His most recent work being 20thCentury Fox Television’s hit series Empire. Prior to Empire, Dennis produced Colony, Tyrant, and Heroes to name a few. Hammer is Emmy nominated, and the recipient of the BAFTA Award.

Filmography

References

Living people
American television producers
Year of birth missing (living people)